Risk management in Indian banks is a relatively newer practice, but has already shown to increase efficiency in governing of these banks as such procedures tend to increase the corporate governance of a financial institution. In times of volatility and fluctuations in the market, financial institutions need to prove their mettle by withstanding the market variations and achieve sustainability in terms of growth and well as have a stable share value. Hence, an essential component of risk management framework would be to mitigate all the risks and rewards of the products and service offered by the bank. Thus the need for an efficient risk management framework is paramount in order to factor in internal and external risks.

Risk Ratio 
Risk ratio would be defined as the ratio of the probability of an issue occurring as against to an issue not occurring.

Total Impact of Risk 
Total impact of the risk (TIR) occurring would entail as the impact (I), the risk  would cause multiplied by the Risk Ratio. It is essentially how much a bank would be impacted in the chance that the risk did occur. This essentially helps ascertain what is the total value of their investments that may be subject to risk and how it would impact them.

Risk and Reward 
The ratio is in simplest terms calculated by dividing the amount of profit the trader expects to have made when the position is closed (i.e. the reward) by the amount he or she stands to lose if the price moves in the unexpected direction (i.e. the risk).

To calculate the total risk ensuing with the total expected return, a favored method is the use of variance or standard deviation. The larger the variance, the larger the standard deviation, the more uncertain the outcome. The standard deviation, E is a measure of average difference between the expected value and the actual value of a random variable (or unseen state of nature).

Here, n stands for a possible outcome, x stands for the expected outcome and P is the probability (or likelihood) of the difference between n and X occurring.

Types of Risk 

The term Risk and the types associated to it would refer to mean financial risk or uncertainty of financial loss. The Reserve Bank of India guidelines issued in Oct. 1999 has identified and categorized the majority of risk into three major categories assumed to be encountered by banks. These belong to the clusters:

Credit risk
Market risk
Operational risk

The type of risks can be fundamentally subdivided in primarily of two types, i.e. Financial and Non-Financial Risk. Financial risks would involve all those aspects which deal mainly with financial aspects of the bank. These can be further subdivided into Credit Risk and Market Risk. Both Credit and Market Risk may be further subdivided.

Non-Financial risks would entail all the risk faced by the bank in its regular workings, i.e. Operational risk, Strategic risk, Funding risk, Political risk, and Legal risk.

See also 
Risk management tools
Probabilistic risk assessment

References 

Financial risk management
Banking in India